The 1990 Regal Scottish Masters was a professional non-ranking snooker tournament that took place between 12 and 16 September 1990 at the Motherwell Civic Centre in Motherwell, Scotland.

Stephen Hendry won the tournament by defeating Terry Griffiths 10–6 in the final.

Main draw

References

1990
Masters
Scottish Masters
Scottish Masters